Diego Morales is a Guatemalan-American politician from Indiana. A Republican, he is the Secretary of State of Indiana.

Early life and career
Morales is from Guatemala, and immigrated to the United States with his parents and sisters when he was in high school. He graduated from Silver Creek High School in Sellersburg, Indiana. and earned his bachelor's degree from Indiana University Southeast in 2004. He enlisted in the United States Army in 2007, but was only on active duty for three months and 18 days. He transferred to the Indiana National Guard, but did not complete the eight-year commitment.

Morales worked for the office of the Secretary of State of Indiana, Todd Rokita. He was fired in 2009 because his work was "incomplete", “inefficient execution”, and a “lack of focus." He took another job in the secretary of state's office, under Charles P. White in 2011, but was fired after a month for "poor execution" and not completing his work.

Morales earned a Master of Business Administration from Purdue University in 2012.

Political career
Morales served as an advisor to Governor Mike Pence.

During the campaign, Morales was accused of exaggerating his political and military experience. He finished third out of six candidates in the Republican primary election, behind the winner, Jim Baird, and Steve Braun.

Morales declared his candidacy in the 2022 Indiana Secretary of State election. He defeated Holli Sullivan, the incumbent, at the Republican nominating convention. During the campaign, Morales was criticized for using campaign funds to purchase a $43,000 Toyota RAV4 and describing himself as a "veteran" even though he only served in the military for three months and he was in the Indiana Army National Guard, not the U.S. Armed Forces (the federal definition of a "veteran" only includes the Armed Forces) Morales joined the America First Secretary of State Coalition, a coalition of secretary of state candidates who endorsed President Donald Trump's false allegations of voter fraud in the 2020 presidential election. After winning the Republican nomination, he changed his stance on the 2020 presidential election, telling The Washington Post that he believed Biden won legitimately. WTHR commented that Morales received the most negative press of any statewide candidate in Indiana since Richard Mourdock in the 2012 Senate race.

Morales defeated Destiny Wells, the Democratic Party nominee, in the November 8 general election. He was the only "America First" coalition candidate to win election in 2022. Although Morales won by a large margin, he underperformed all other statewide Republican nominees in Indiana by 5–7 percentage points.

The Indianapolis Star reported that Morales may have committed felony voter fraud twice by voting in Hendricks County in 2018 despite living in Marion County.

Personal life
Morales met his wife, Sidonia, while studying in Europe. She immigrated to the United States and they married in 2013. He has an adult daughter.

Two women have accused Morales of sexually assaulting them. Morales denied their accusations.

References

External links

|-

1970s births
21st-century American politicians
Guatemalan emigrants to the United States
Indiana Republicans
Indiana University Southeast alumni
Living people
Purdue University alumni
Secretaries of State of Indiana